Leadmine Wildlife Management Area is a  wildlife conservation area located in Holland and Sturbridge, Massachusetts. The conservation area abuts the Tantiusques reservation and the  its satellite Crowd Site, owned by The Trustees of Reservations. It is managed by the Massachusetts Division of Fisheries and Wildlife. Hunting (in season), hiking, and other outdoor recreational pursuits are enjoyed on the property.

The conservation area is named after the nearby colonial-era graphite mining industry at Tantiusques.

Note that the Leadmine WMA pond depicted on this page may no longer exist in the same form (or even as a pond anymore) as in 2017 the dams were removed from the three adjacent ponds (Upper Pond, Middle Pond and Lower Pond) which were then linked in series by Hamant Brook.

References

External links
Map of Leadmine Wildlife Management Area
Massachusetts Department Of Fish and Game
List of Massachusetts WMAs By District

Protected areas of Worcester County, Massachusetts
Wildlife refuges in Massachusetts
Sturbridge, Massachusetts